NBC Albany may refer to:

WNYT (TV) in Albany, New York
WALB in Albany, Georgia